Ophiomastix is a genus of echinoderms belonging to the family Ophiocomidae.

The species of this genus are found in Tropical and Subtropical regions.

Species:

Ophiomastix annulosa 
Ophiomastix asperula 
Ophiomastix australis
Ophiomastix brocki 
Ophiomastix caryophyllata 
Ophiomastix corallicola 
Ophiomastix elegans 
Ophiomastix endeani 
Ophiomastix flaccida 
Ophiomastix janualis 
Ophiomastix koehleri 
Ophiomastix lymani 
Ophiomastix macroplaca 
Ophiomastix marshallensis 
Ophiomastix mixta 
Ophiomastix occidentalis 
Ophiomastix ornata 
Ophiomastix palaoensis 
Ophiomastix pictum 
Ophiomastix stenozonula 
Ophiomastix variabilis 
Ophiomastix venosa 
Ophiomastix wendtii

References

Ophiocomidae
Ophiuroidea genera